Al-Rubbah  is a Syrian village located in Salamiyah Subdistrict in Salamiyah District, Hama.  According to the Syria Central Bureau of Statistics (CBS), Al-Rubbah had a population of 1813 in the 2004 census. The nearby Tell Rubba dates back to the Hellenistic period.

References 

Populated places in Salamiyah District